P'ungri station is a railway station in Onsŏng county, North Hamgyŏng, North Korea, on the Hambuk Line of the Korean State Railway, which is North Korea's railway.

History
It was opened by the Chosen Government Railway on 1 November 1932, together with the rest of the Unsŏng–P'ungri section of the East Tomun Line.

References

Railway stations in North Korea